Llanddarog is a community located in Carmarthenshire, Wales.The community population at the 2011 census was 1,198., and includes the villages of Cwmisfael,  Mynyddcerrig and Porthyrhyd.

The community is bordered by the communities of: Llanarthney; Gorslas; Pontyberem; Llangyndeyrn; and Llangunnor, all being in Carmarthenshire.

Governance
An electoral ward of the same name exists. This ward stretches beyond the confines of Llanddarog with a total population of 1,963.

References

External links 
GENUKI page
www.geograph.co.uk : photos of Llanddarog and surrounding area

Communities in Carmarthenshire
Villages in Carmarthenshire